The 1970–71 Tercera División season was the 37th since the establishment.

League tables

Group I

Group II

Group III

Group IV

Promotion playoff

Relegation playoff

Season records 
 Most wins: 28, Cultural Leonesa and Ourense.
 Most draws: 15, Mirandés.
 Most losses: 29, Ejea.
 Most goals for: 90, Cultural Leonesa.
 Most goals against: 89, Toluca.
 Most points: 61, Cultural Leonesa.
 Fewest wins: 4, Ejea.
 Fewest draws: 4, Ourense, Sestao, Carabanchel and Tortosa.
 Fewest losses: 5, Cultural Leonesa and Xerez.
 Fewest goals for: 24, Ejea.
 Fewest goals against: 20, Ourense and Tenerife.
 Fewest points: 13, Ejea.

External links 
 www.rsssf.com
 www.futbolme.com

Tercera División seasons
3
Spain